Tomb KV18, located in the Valley of the Kings in Egypt, was intended for the burial of Pharaoh Ramesses X of the Twentieth Dynasty; however, because it was apparently abandoned while still incomplete and since no funerary equipment was ever found there, it is uncertain whether it was actually used for his burial.

The tomb consists of an entryway and two sections of corridor separated by gates. The entryway was used by Howard Carter in the early 20th century as the site of the Valley's first electricity generator; he also had some of the corridor walls whitewashed. After penetrating the hillside for a distance of some 43 metres, it ends at the rock face into which a series of rough steps have been carved.

Very little is known about this tomb, and the final section of corridor was properly cleared of the voluminous flood débris filling it only recently.

References
Reeves, N & Wilkinson, R.H. The Complete Valley of the Kings, 1996, Thames and Hudson, London.
Siliotti, A. Guide to the Valley of the Kings and to the Theban Necropolises and Temples, 1996, A.A. Gaddis, Cairo.

External links
Theban Mapping Project: KV18 includes description, images, and plans of the tomb.

Buildings and structures completed in the 12th century BC
Valley of the Kings
Ramesses X